Stackallan is a civil parish in  County Meath, Ireland.

The area is notable for the presence of Stackallan House, one of the earliest surviving examples of unfortified classical housing in Ireland constructed around 1712.

References

Civil parishes of County Meath